Ochrosia sevenetii, synonym Neisosperma sevenetii, is a species of flowering plant in the family Apocynaceae. It is endemic to New Caledonia, where it is known from only two sites. Its habitat is threatened with encroachment and fire.

References

Endemic flora of New Caledonia
sevenetii
Taxonomy articles created by Polbot

Critically endangered flora of Oceania